Michael "Mike" Stephen Magac (May 25, 1938 – August 25, 2003) was a professional American football guard in the National Football League. He played seven seasons for the San Francisco 49ers (1960–1964) and the Pittsburgh Steelers (1965–1966).

1938 births
2003 deaths
Sportspeople from East St. Louis, Illinois
Players of American football from Illinois
American football offensive guards
Missouri Tigers football players
San Francisco 49ers players
Pittsburgh Steelers players